The Barry Burn, otherwise known as Pitairlie Burn is a minor river in Angus, Scotland. It rises in the eastern portion of the Sidlaw Hills and flows past Newbigging, through Barry and the western part of Carnoustie, before taking a meandering course through Carnoustie Golf Links.

References

Rivers of Angus, Scotland